The FC Basel 1911–12 season was their nineteenth season since the club's foundation. The club's chairman was Ernst-Alfred Thalmann, it was his tenth presidential term altogether and his fourth in succession. FC Basel played their home games in the Landhof in the district Basel-Wettstein in Kleinbasel, Basel.

Overview 
During the 1911–12 season Emil Hasler was the team captain for the fourth consequtive season and as captain he led the team trainings and was responsible for the line-ups. Basel played a total of 37 matches, 23 friendly games and 14 in the domestic league. Of the friendlies five of the games were played abroad and of the home games five were hosted against foreign clubs. Seven were played against German teams. On 27 August 1911 Basel hosted their first German opponent and this game against FV Baden-Baden was won 7–1. The other three pre-season matches were also won and all three against Swiss teams. During the winter break the team travelled to Italy. On Christmas Eve they were beaten 1–0 by Genoa and on Boxing day they played a 5–5 draw with SG Andrea Doria. At the end of the season the team made a short tour to Germany and played games against Kickers Offenbach and Karlsruher FC Phönix. Basel also hosted French team Mulhouse. Of these 23 friendlies 10 were won, 3 were drawn and 10 were defeats.

The Swiss Serie A 1911–12 was divided into three regional groups. Eight teams in the east group, eight in the central and seven in the east group. Basel were allocated to the central group together with local rivals Old Boys and newly promoted Nordstern Basel. The other teams playing in the Central group were Biel-Bienne, FC Bern, Young Boys, FC La Chaux-de-Fonds and Étoile-Sporting (La Chaux-de-Fonds). Basel started the season badly, losing three of their first four matches and they ended it badly, losing four of their last six games. During the seasin Basel won five league matches, drew two, but lost seven, scoring a total of 30 goals and conceding 34. Étoile-Sporting won the group and qualified for the finals. Aarau became Swiss champions.

Players 
Squad members

Results 

Legend

Friendly matches

Pre- and mid season

Winter break to end of season

Serie A

Central group results

Central group league table

See also
 History of FC Basel
 List of FC Basel players
 List of FC Basel seasons

Notes

Footnotes

Incomplete league matches 1911–12 season: FCB-Nordstern, LcdF-FCB, Sporting-FCB, Biel-FCB, FCB-Biel, YB-FCB

References

Sources 
 Rotblau: Jahrbuch Saison 2014/2015. Publisher: FC Basel Marketing AG. 
 Die ersten 125 Jahre. Publisher: Josef Zindel im Friedrich Reinhardt Verlag, Basel. 
 FCB squad at fcb-archiv.ch.
 Switzerland 1911-12 at RSSSF

External links
 FC Basel official site

FC Basel seasons
Basel